Birch Harbor is an unincorporated village in the town of Gouldsboro, Hancock County, Maine, United States. Birch Harbor has a post office with ZIP code 04613, which opened on March 26, 1880.

References

Villages in Hancock County, Maine
Villages in Maine